One of the Southampton Island offshore island groups, the Ascension Islands are uninhabited islands located in Foxe Basin's Foxe Channel, northwest of Caribou Island. They are part of the Kivalliq Region, in the Canadian territory of Nunavut.

References 

Islands of Foxe Basin
Uninhabited islands of Kivalliq Region